John Albert McKenzie (December 12, 1937 – June 9, 2018) was a Canadian professional hockey player and coach. He played in the National Hockey League (NHL) for several seasons, most notably with the Boston Bruins, with whom he won the Stanley Cup twice. He also played several seasons in the World Hockey Association (WHA).

Playing career
McKenzie's former teammate Gerry Melnyk dubbed the young player "Pieface" for his resemblance to a cartoon figure of the same name featured on the wrapper of a popular Canadian candy bar; this was later shortened to "Pie."  He played junior hockey for three years with the St. Catharines Teepees of the OHA and led the league in goals and points in 1958.

McKenzie made his NHL debut in 1958–59 with the Chicago Black Hawks.  The following season he moved on to the Detroit Red Wings, where he lasted two years.  He was then demoted again to the minors, where he played most of three seasons in the American Hockey League with the Hershey Bears and the Buffalo Bisons, and was named to the league's First All-Star Team in 1963.  He returned to the NHL and the Black Hawks in 1963–64, and two years later played for the New York Rangers for part of the 1965–66 season, halfway during which he was traded to the Rangers' arch-rivals, the Boston Bruins.  McKenzie scored his first goal as a Bruin on January 20, 1966 in Boston's 4-3 home victory over Chicago.

It was with the Bruins that the 5-foot-9-inch, 170 pound (77 kg) right wing had the most productive seasons of his career.  He became a star in the 1967-68 season, scoring twenty-eight goals and gaining a reputation as a pesky, relentless hustler.  He scored twenty-nine goals each of the next two seasons, and was named to the Second Team All-Star in 1969–70.  In the playoffs that year he scored seventeen points in fourteen games, fourth on the team after Bobby Orr, Phil Esposito and John Bucyk and did so again in 1971-72.  His best season was 1970–71, when he scored 31 goals and 77 points in 65 games.  All in all, McKenzie scored 169 goals in his seven years in Boston and helped the Bruins win two Stanley Cup titles, in 1970 and 1972.

At the end of the sixth and last game in the 1972 Stanley Cup finals, when the Bruins defeated the New York Rangers at Madison Square Garden 3-0 to take the Cup, McKenzie skated to center ice, raised one arm in mimicry of the Statue of Liberty, placed his other hand around his neck to appear as though he were choking, then jumped up and down in a circle several times.  (Thus he implied, to the Rangers and their fans, that the Rangers had choked at their best chance of winning their first Stanley Cup since 1940). This became known as the "McKenzie Choke Dance," or simply the "choke dance."

In the summer of 1972, McKenzie was disgruntled at being left unprotected in the expansion draft, and he signed as player-coach with the Philadelphia Blazers of the newly formed World Hockey Association (WHA).  In thirteen games he recorded only two wins and eleven losses, and he stepped down as coach in favor of veteran Phil Watson.  He continued to play effectively for the Blazers, then for the Minnesota Fighting Saints, the Cincinnati Stingers and finally the New England Whalers.  He finished his career in the WHA's final season in 1978-79, having played twenty-one seasons of professional hockey in the NHL and WHA.

Later life
In 2007, McKenzie served as the coach of the Berklee Ice Cats, the newly formed hockey team at Berklee College of Music in Boston. Following that, he was the liaison for hockey development at the University of Massachusetts Lowell.

McKenzie died at his home in Wakefield, Massachusetts, at age 80 on June 9, 2018, after a long illness.

Career achievements and legacy
Played in 477 WHA games (7th all-time), totalling 163 goals, 250 assists and 413 points (16th all-time)
Played in the NHL All-Star Game in 1970 and 1972
Played in the Summit Series for Team Canada in 1974 against the Soviet Union
His #19 was retired by the Hartford Whalers, making him one of only three players whose number was retired by an NHL franchise for which he never played (the other two being J. C. Tremblay by the Quebec Nordiques and Frank Finnigan by the modern-day Ottawa Senators).
In 2010, he was elected as an inaugural inductee into the World Hockey Association Hall of Fame in the "Legends of the Game" category.

Honours
Buffalo Bisons
Calder Cup: 1963
Boston Bruins
Stanley Cup: 1970, 1972

Career statistics

Regular season and playoffs

International

Coaching record

References

Further reading

External links

McKenzie's name on the 1970 Stanley Cup plaque via Wayback Machine

1937 births
2018 deaths
Boston Bruins players
Buffalo Bisons (AHL) players
Canadian ice hockey forwards
Canadian people of Scottish descent
Chicago Blackhawks players
Cincinnati Stingers players
Hartford Whalers announcers
Hershey Bears players
Ice hockey people from Alberta
Minnesota Fighting Saints players
National Hockey League broadcasters
National Hockey League players with retired numbers
New England Whalers players
New York Rangers players
People from High River
Philadelphia Blazers players
St. Catharines Teepees players
Stanley Cup champions
Vancouver Blazers players
Ice hockey player-coaches